Justice Hornblower or Judge Hornblower or variant, may refer to:

Joseph Coerten Hornblower, chief justice of the New Jersey Supreme Court
William B. Hornblower, judge of the New York Court of Appeals

See also

 Hornblower (surname)
 Hornblower (disambiguation)
 Justice (disambiguation)
 Judge (disambiguation)